Congregation Emanu-El of San Francisco, California is one of the two oldest Jewish congregations in California, and one of the largest Jewish congregations in the United States. A member of the Union for Reform Judaism, Congregation Emanu-El is a significant gathering place for the Bay Area Jewish community.

History
During the Gold Rush in 1849, a small group of Jews held the first High Holy Days services in a tent in San Francisco, it was the first Jewish service on the West Coast of the United States. This group of traders and merchants founded Congregation Emanu-El sometime in 1850, and its charter was issued in April, 1851. The 16 signatories were mostly German Jews from Bavaria.

In 1860, Reform rabbi, Elkan Cohn, joined the Emanu-El congregation and in 1877, he led them as the first congregation in the West to join the Reform Movement. As the Reform Movement in Judaism spread in the United States during the early twentieth century, the synagogue became affiliated with this framework. 

In 1884 Julie Rosewald became America's first female cantor when she began serving in Emanu-El, although she was not ordained. She served as a cantor there until 1893.

Among its major programs today, the synagogue includes worship, youth and adult education programs, and also a major emphasis on social justice.

Clergy

Notable members

References

Further reading
 Rosenbaum, Fred, Visions of Reform : Congregation Emanu-El and the Jews of San Francisco 1849–1999, Judah L. Magnes Museum, 2000,  
 Rosenbaum, Fred, Architects of reform: congregational and community leadership Emanu-El of San Francisco, 1849–1980, Western Jewish History Center, Judah L. Magnes Memorial Museum, 1980
 Voorsanger, Jacob, The Chronicles of Emanu-El, Spaulding Press, 1900.

External links

 

Synagogues in San Francisco
Reform synagogues in California
Religious organizations established in 1851
1851 establishments in California
German-American culture in California
German-Jewish culture in the United States
Synagogues completed in 1926
1920s architecture in the United States
1926 establishments in California
Arthur Brown Jr. buildings
Byzantine Revival synagogues
Byzantine Revival architecture in California
Mediterranean Revival architecture in California
Synagogue buildings with domes